Phu Phiang is a district (amphoe) in the central part of Nan province, northern Thailand.

History
The area was separated from Mueang Nan district to create a minor district (king amphoe) on 1 July 1997.

On 15 May 2007, all 81 minor districts were upgraded to full districts. On August 24 the upgrade became official.

Etymology
The name Phu Phiang comes from the name of Phu Phiang Mountain, which has the That Chae Haeng positioned on the top.

Geography
Neighboring districts are (from the north clockwise) Santi Suk, Mae Charim, Wiang Sa, and Mueang Nan of Nan Province.

The eastern part of the district is in the Luang Prabang Range mountain area of the Thai highlands.

Administration
The district is divided into seven sub-districts (tambons), which are further subdivided into 61 villages (mubans). There are no municipal (thesaban) areas, and seven tambon administrative organizations (TAO).

References

External links
amphoe.com (Thai)

Phu Phiang